An executor is someone who is responsible for executing, or following through on, an assigned task or duty. The feminine form, executrix, may sometimes be used.

Overview

An executor is a legal term referring to a person named by the maker of a will or nominated by the testator to carry out the instructions of the will. Typically, the executor is the person responsible for offering the will for probate, although it is not required that they fulfill this. The executor's duties also include disbursing property to the beneficiaries as designated in the will, obtaining information of potential heirs, collecting and arranging for payment of debts of the estate and approving or disapproving creditors' claims.

They will also assist the attorney with the estate. Additionally, the executor acts as a legal conveyor who designates where the donations will be sent using the information left in bequests, whether they be sent to charity or other organizations. In most circumstances, the executor is the representative of the estate for all purposes, and has the ability to sue or be sued on behalf of the estate. The executor holds legal title to the estate property, but may not use the title or property for their own benefit, unless permitted by the terms of the will.

A person who deals with a deceased person's property without proper authority is known as an executor de son tort. Such a person's actions may subsequently be ratified by the lawful executors or administrators if the actions do not contradict the substantive provisions of the deceased's will or the rights of heirs at law.

When there is no will, a person is said to have died intestate—"without testimony." As a result, there is no tangible "testimony" to follow, and hence there can be no executor. If there is no will or the executors named in a will do not wish to act, an administrator of the deceased's estate may instead be appointed.  The generic term for executors or administrators is personal representative. In England and Wales, when a person dies intestate in a nursing home, and has no family members who can be traced, those responsible for their care automatically become their executors.

Under Scottish law, a personal representative of any kind is referred to as an executor, using executor nominate to refer to an executor and executor dative to an administrator.

Any person designated as an executor may choose not to administer the estate. In the U.K., upon making that choice the designated person may execute a "power reserved" letter, which will allow the person to later act as executor if the person named on the Grant of Probate is removed or is no longer able to act.

Executor pay
In some countries, such as the United States, an executor is automatically entitled to compensation for his or her services, although this amount varies dramatically by jurisdiction.  Unless specifically set by the will, this compensation is often determined by what is considered ″reasonable″ for the effort involved, although in a number of jurisdictions, the amount is instead set as a percentage of the overall estate.  For example, in California the executor is entitled to 4% of the first $100K of estate value, 3% of the next $100K, and so on. In other countries, such as the United Kingdom, the executor is not automatically entitled to compensation, although compensation can be directed within the will or on application to a court.

Insurance policies
In recent years, custom "executors' insurance" policies have entered the marketplace. These are currently available in countries including Canada, England, and Wales. They are often taken up by non-professional executors—typically friends or family of the deceased—who may be worried about potentially making an error during the probate process and/or uncomfortable about exposing themselves to unlimited personal financial and legal liability. Many find such cover an attractive proposition as the vast majority of wills allow reasonable expenses, such as the cost of the policy, to be reclaimed from the deceased's estate.

See also
Digital estate
Estate
Executorial trustee
Inheritance
Literary executor
Probate sale

References

External links
 Executor of a will duties - A list of duties for a Will Executor (England & Wales only)
 Executor Guide - Interactive guide for a Will Executor (United States & Canada only)
 Canadian legislation and regulation (searchable by Province) governing executors of estates.  Via CanLII.

Legal terminology
Legal professions
Insurance law legal terminology